Alessandra Cappa (born 19 May 1982) is a backstroke swimmer from Italy who won the bronze medal in the women's 50 metres backstroke event at the 2004 European Championships. She represented her native country a couple of months later at the 2004 Summer Olympics in Athens, Greece.

References

 Profile

1982 births
Living people
Italian female swimmers
Swimmers at the 2004 Summer Olympics
Olympic swimmers of Italy
Sportspeople from Verona
European Aquatics Championships medalists in swimming
Italian female backstroke swimmers
21st-century Italian women